The Little Saskatchewan River is a river in western Manitoba. Its approximate length is 185 km. The watershed includes numerous lakes and three man made reservoirs (Minnedosa Lake, Rapid City Reservoir and Lake Wahtopanah.

In 1911 the Geographic Board of Canada adopted the name Minnedosa River but restored the original name in 1978. Some early settlers to the area arrived when the river was in flood and thought it was the Saskatchewan River.

See also
List of rivers of Manitoba

External links
Summary of Resources and Land Use in the Little Saskatchewan River Watershed

References

Rivers of Manitoba
Tributaries of the Assiniboine River